Oyster Bay is a small coastal hamlet and resort located about  west of St Francis Bay on the Eastern Cape Coast of South Africa.  It forms part of the Kouga Local Municipality of the Sarah Baartman District.

Oyster Bay is the closest community to Thyspunt, the preferred site for South Africa's next nuclear power station.

References

Populated places in the Kouga Local Municipality
Populated coastal places in South Africa